Pandit Tara Singh Narotam (1822–1891) or also Pundit Tara Singh Nawtam was a famous Punjabi scholar who belonged to the Hindu-Sikh Nirmala Sect.

Biography 
Pundit Tara Singh was born into a Sikh family who were originally Brahmins. At the age of twenty, he left his village kahlwan, which was near Qadian, and he arrived at the Niramala dera of Sant Gulab Singh at Kurala, Hoshiarpur.

He was now a renowned scholar and had accumulated some fame throughout the region. The Maharaja of Patiala, Maharaja Narinder Singh (1824–1862) gave patronage to him after which Tara Singh came to Patiala and established his own Nirmala dera by the name of Dharam Dhuja and began doing scholarly work. Pundit Tara Singh taught a large group of scholars which include the famous Sikh historian Giani Gain Singh (1822–1921) and Bishan Singh Ji Muralewale of the Damdami Taksal.

Finding Hemkunt 

Pundit Tara Singh was the first Sikh to trace the geographical location of Hemkunt Sahib. Using clues from the Bachitar Natak to reveal Guru Gobind Singh's tap asthan (place of meditation) such as the place was named Sapatsring (seven peaks) and was on or near Hemkunt Parbat (lake of ice mountain) he set out to explore the Garhwal Himalayas and his search took him to Badrinath and to the nearby village of Pandukeshwar, near the present-day Gobind Ghat.

Gurbani Interpretation
Pandit Tara Singh conforms to the Nirmala school of thought. He presents Sikhism from a Vedantic orientation, and it being a blend of Sankara and Ramanuja. . He believed that Guru Nanak Dev was an incarnation of Sri Vishnu (Mahavishnu as opposed to the deva) and that Waheguru was another name for Mahavishnu. He wrote extensively about the meaning of Waheguru in his book Waheguru Shabad-Arth Tika. In the Mahan Kosh, it is written that Pandit Tara Singh believes that the Sarbloh Granth was produced by Bhai Sukha Singh, the head Granthi of Patna Sahib from a manuscript given by an Udasi from Shri Jagannathpuri (Odisha) who said it was Guru Gobind Singh's writing. Pandit Tara Singh also believes that the entire Dasam Granth was written by Guru Gobind Singh.

Published works
He may have written an commentary on the entire SGGS but it is assumed to be lost. His more famous works are Gurmat Nirnay Sagar, Sri Gur Tirath Sangrah, and Guru Girarath Kos. Other notable works include a commentary on Bani of the Bhagats included in the Guru Granth Sahib.

 Vahiguru Sabdarth (1862)
 Tika Bhagat Banika (1872)
 Tika Guru Bhav Dipika (1879)
 Sri Guru Tirath Sangrahi (1883)
 Granth Sri Gurmat Nirnaya Sagar (1877)
 Sabda Sur Kosh (1866)
 Akal Murati Pradarsan (1878)
 Guru Vans Taru Darpan (1878)
 Granth Guru Girarth Kosh (1889)
 Prikhia Prakaran (1890)
 Tika Sri Raga (1885)
 Updesh Shatak Basha
 Sehrafi Raje Bharthari
 Japji Sahib Steek

References

1822 births
1891 deaths
Punjabi-language writers